Paul Kilderry (born 11 April 1973) is a former professional tennis player from Australia.

Kilderry enjoyed most of his tennis success while playing doubles.  During his career he won 3 doubles titles.  He achieved a career-high doubles ranking of World No. 67 in 1996.

Paul Kilderry was appointed as the Hopman Cup tournament director in 2013.

Junior Grand Slam finals

Doubles: 1 (1 runner-up)

ATP career finals

Doubles: 5 (3 titles, 2 runner-ups)

ATP Challenger and ITF Futures Finals

Singles: 2 (1–1)

Doubles: 15 (9–6)

Performance timelines

Singles

Doubles

Mixed doubles

External links
 
 

Australian male tennis players
1973 births
Living people
Tennis players from Perth, Western Australia